SS James Gunn was a Liberty ship built in the United States during World War II. She was named after James Gunn, a delegate to the Continental Congress and a United States senator from Georgia.

Construction
James Gunn was laid down on 6 April 1942, under a Maritime Commission (MARCOM) contract, MCE hull 44, by the Bethlehem-Fairfield Shipyard, Baltimore, Maryland; she was sponsored by Mrs. James Ross, the wife of Captain Ross, the manager of the Baltimore office for the ABS, and was launched on 8 June 1942.

History
She was allocated to Seas Shipping Co., Inc., on 24 June 1942. On 6 September 1949, she was laid up in the National Defense Reserve Fleet, Beaumont, Texas. On 7 November 1969, she was sold for scrapping to Southern Scrap Material Co., Ltd. She was withdrawn from the fleet on 23 March 1970.

References

Bibliography

 
 
 
 

 

Liberty ships
Ships built in Baltimore
1942 ships
Beaumont Reserve Fleet